Mable is a feminine given name and a surname. Notable people with the name include:

Given name
Mable Burton Ringling (1875–1929), American art collector
Mable Elmore, Canadian politician
Mable Fergerson (born 1955), American athlete
Mable Hillery (1929–1976), American singer
Mable Howard (1905–1994), American community leader
Mable John (1930–2022), American blues vocalist
Mable Lee (1921–2019), American musician
Mable Mathews, American politician
Mable Thomas (born 1957), American politician

Middle name
Doris Mable Cochran (1898–1968), American herpetologist

Surname
Bob Mable (1885–1960), Australian rugby league footballer

See also
 Mable (disambiguation)

English feminine given names